The Cathedral of St. Mary of la Seu Vella (Catalan and Spanish: Catedral de Santa Maria de la Seu Vella, English: St. Mary of the Old —Bishop— Seat) is the former cathedral church of the Roman Catholic Diocese of Lleida, in Lleida, Catalonia, Spain, located on top of Lleida hill.

In 1707, the Gothic cathedral was turned into a military citadel by decision of King Philip V of Spain. The new cathedral, known as the Seu Nova (New See) and located downhill at Carrer Major, was consecrated in 1781.

Nevertheless, the Seu Vella is the defining monument of Lleida, the symbol of the city, being visible from its hilltop site anywhere in the city.

History
The site was previously occupied by a Palaeo-Christian and Visigothic cathedral, which later, after the Islamic conquest of Spain, was rebuilt in 832 to be used as a mosque. In 1149, after the city's conquest by the Christian Ramon Berenguer IV of Barcelona and Ermengol VI of Urgell (1149), the structure was reconsecrated as "Santa Maria Antiqua", and entrusted to canons regular.

In 1193, however, the cathedral chapter ordered the construction of a new edifice, following the contemporary Romanesque architectural canons, to master Pere de Coma. The first stone was laid in 1203 by King Peter II of Aragon and count Ermengol VII of Urgell. Construction continued throughout the reign of James I of Aragon. It was consecrated to the Virgin Mary on 31 October 1278. The cloisters not were completed until the 14th century. The bell tower was begun in 14th century and finished in 1431. The portal Porta dels Apòstols begun in the 14th and completed in 15th century.

In 1707, the city was conquered by the troops of Philip V: the king ordered the destruction of the cathedral because it has taken a prominent part in the city's defense. Nevertheless, the order was never executed, and the cathedral was converted into barracks. The building was declared a national monument in 1918, and restoration works were started in 1950.

Description
The cathedral is designed in a transitional style between Romanesque and Gothic. It lacks almost any influence of Islamic architecture. The floor plan is of a basilica in a Latin cross with a nave and two aisles. The tower is octagonal with a central space of five apses. The interior was decorated in painted murals and sculpture, much of which is still preserved, but much of which has been despoiled during the War of Spanish Succession.

A bell named Mònica announces the quarter-hours and one Silvestra announces the hours. The bells are of the international Gothic style of the 15th century.

The cloister is unusually placed in front of the main entrance of the church, and is notable for both its rare opened gallery with views over the city and for its extraordinary size. In fact, this cloister has been regarded as one of the largest cloisters in Europe. This cloister has 17 ornate Gothic windows, each of them different. Among them, one could point out the Muslim window of "the palmtrees" and the central one of the westernmost wing, with a complex decoration which includes both a King David's Star and a Christian cross.

References

Sources
 Consorci Del Turó De La Seu Vella De Lleida - Official website

Religion in Lleida
Former mosques in Spain
Conversion of non-Christian religious buildings and structures into churches
13th-century Roman Catholic church buildings in Spain
15th-century Roman Catholic church buildings in Spain
Buildings and structures in Lleida
Romanesque architecture in Catalonia
Gothic architecture in Catalonia
Roman Catholic cathedrals in Catalonia